This is a list of dams in Saudi Arabia. As of 2014 there are 482 dams in country across all regions with total capacities of 2.08 Billion cubic meters. This list includes a part of these dams.

Riyadh Region 

 Al-Alab dam.
Haeer dam.
Hanabej dam.
Hareeq dam.
Helwah dam.
Lasad dam.

Mecca Region 

 Murwani dam.
 Wadi Hali dam.
 Al-Lith dam.
 Wadi Rabigh dam.
 Wadi Fatimahdam dam.
Arda dam.
 Tarba dam.
Laya dam.
Murayfeg dam.
Nawfla dam.
Qrn dam.

Madina Region 

Qaa hathutha dam.
Fareah dam.
 Wadi Alfaraah dam.
Alakool dam.
Malal dam

'Asir Region 

 King Fahad dam
 Wadi Abha.
Aayash dam.
Al-Hifah dam.
Al-Mahzamah dam.
Araer dam.
Asem dam.
Ashran dam.
Baniqayis dam.
Bdwah dam.
Farwan dam.
Ghraba dam.
Hatheam dam.
Ittwid dam.
Motha dam.
Radah dam.

Jazan Region 

 Baish dam
 Jizan dam

Najran Region 

 Wadi Najran Dam.

Al-Baha Region 
 Al-Habees dam.
 Matwah dam.
 Dbdb dam.
 Al-Ureisheen dam.
 Zaqat dam.
 Al-Qim dam.
 Zarwah dam.
 Al-Malah dam.
 Al-Marba dam.
 Al-Kharrar dam.
 Al-Talqiyah dam.
 Subayhah dam.
 Al-Mazlumat dam.
 Al-Sadr dam.
 Madhas dam.
 Beedah dam.
Assadir dam.
Beda dam.
Dhuaian dam.
Marbaa dam.
Marzoq dam.
Maslah dam.

References 

 
Saudi Arabia
Dams